Izzue is a fashion brand, pronounced as "Issue".  It is a part of the Hong Kong fashion conglomerate I.T. Stores are scattered across Asia including Hong Kong SAR, People's Republic of China, Thailand, Malaysia, Macau SAR, Republic of China, Saudi Arabia, and Germany. Its clothes features casual urban and desaturated style. Promotional material uses the brand's website as the company logo. The clothing is "Asian-fit", slimmer than American and European brands.

Controversy
Izzue was embroiled in controversy when it used Nazi Germany themes on its clothes and decor, including swastikas, banners, and propaganda films, as part of its decor during its 2003 season. Marketing manager Deborah Cheng apologized and issued a statement saying "that the designer did not realize that the Nazi symbols would be considered offensive."

References

External links

 Company Website
 Anti Defamation League: ADL Outraged by Hong Kong Fashion Company's Use of Nazi Symbols

Clothing brands of Hong Kong
Clothing companies of Hong Kong
Companies with year of establishment missing
Clothing retailers of Hong Kong